Pascal Dangbo (born April 13, 1972) is a Beninese sprinter who took part in the 1992, 1996 and 2000 Summer Olympics.

References

Living people
1972 births
Beninese male sprinters
Olympic athletes of Benin
Athletes (track and field) at the 1992 Summer Olympics
Athletes (track and field) at the 1996 Summer Olympics
Athletes (track and field) at the 2000 Summer Olympics